, better known by her stage name , is a Japanese model and actress. She rose to fame in the drama Kimi wa Petto with Jun Matsumoto and gained huge popularity, as well as the hit film The Last Samurai.

Career

Actor career
Koyuki appeared in Kiyoshi Kurosawa's 2001 film Pulse. 

She rose to fame in the drama Kimi wa Petto (2003) with Jun matsumoto and gained huge popularity.
Her first international film was The Last Samurai (2003) where she played Taka, wife of a Samurai slain by the character Nathan Algren, portrayed by Tom Cruise. 

She has appeared in many commercials, including Coca-Cola Japan's Sokenbicha, P&G Max Factor SK-II, and Suntory Kakubin.

Personal life 
In 2011, Koyuki married actor Kenichi Matsuyama, who co-starred with her in Kamui Gaiden. 

The couple's first child was born in January 2012, and their second child was born in January 2013. In July 2015, the couple had their third child.

Filmography

Film
 Keizoku/eiga (2000)
 Pulse (2001) - Harue Karasawa
 Laundry (2002) - Mizue
 Alive (2002) - Asuka Saegusa
 Spy Sorge (2003) - Yoshiko Yamazaki
 The Last Samurai (2003) - Taka
 Kwaidan: Eternal Love (2004) - O-Iwa
 Always: Sunset on Third Street (2005) - Hiromi Ishizaki
 Jam Films S (2005)
 GeGeGe no Kitarō (2007) - Tenko
 Always: Sunset on Third Street 2 (2007) - Hiromi Ishizaki
 Blood: The Last Vampire (2009) - 	Onigen
 Kamui Gaiden (2009) - Sugaru
 It's on Me (2009) - Maya Yamabuki
 Shin-san Tankoumachi no serenâde (2010) - Michiyo
 Detective in the Bar (2011) - Saori
 Always: Sunset on Third Street '64 (2012) - Hiromi Ishizaki
 Persona Non Grata (2015) - Yukiko Sugihara
 A Mother's Touch (2022) - Reiko Fukushima

Television
 Taburoido (1998)
 Koi wa Aserazu (1998)
 Renai Kekkon no Hosoku (1999) - Haruka
 Antique Bakery
 Beautiful Life (2000) - Nakajima Satsuki
 Ikebukuro West Gate Park (2000) - Matsui Kana
 Love Complex (2000) - Kiiko Ninagawa
 Itaria Tsu (2001)
 Tentai Kansoku (2002)
 Tramps Like Us (Also known as Kimi wa Petto) (2003)
 The Eldest Boy and His Three Elder Sisters (2004)
 The Way We Live (2004) - Yura Kitajima
 Engine (2005) - Tomomi Mizukoshi
 Sasaki Fusai no Jingi Naki Tatakai (2008) - Sasaki Ritsuko
 Mr. Brain (2009) - Miyase Kumiko
 Fumō Chitai (2009) - Senri akitsu / Chisato Akitsu
 Legal High (2013) - Ando Kiwa
 The Long Goodbye (2014) - Aiko kamiido
 Fragile (2016)
 Dai Binbo (2017)
 The Naked Director (2019) - Kayo
 Bones of Steel (2020) - Risa Shibata

Dubbing
 Eragon, Arya (Sienna Guillory)
 Snow White and the Huntsman, Queen Ravenna (Charlize Theron)

Awards

References

External links
 
 
 

1976 births
Japanese female models
Japanese film actresses
Japanese television actresses
Living people
People from Zama, Kanagawa
Actresses from Kanagawa Prefecture
Avex Group talents
20th-century Japanese actresses
21st-century Japanese actresses
Models from Kanagawa Prefecture